Qezel Dagh (also Romanized as Qezel Dāgh; also known as Qezel Dāghī) is a village in Charuymaq-e Markazi Rural District, in the Central District of Charuymaq County, East Azerbaijan Province, Iran. At the 2006 census, its population was 197, in 43 families.

References 

Populated places in Charuymaq County